Hard Rock Live is a live album and video by the English hard rock band Bad Company released in 2010. It was recorded at the Hard Rock Live in Hollywood, Florida on August 8, 2008, and marked the first time original members Paul Rodgers, Mick Ralphs and Simon Kirke had performed together, since their brief reunion in 1999.

Track listing 
"Bad Company" (Simon Kirke, Paul Rodgers) - 5:48
"Honey Child" (Boz Burrell, Kirke, Mick Ralphs, Rodgers) - 3:52
"Burnin' Sky" (Rodgers) - 6:07
"Gone, Gone, Gone" (Burrell) - 4:41
"Run with the Pack" (Rodgers) - 4:33
"Live for the Music" (Ralphs) - 5:14
"Seagull" (Ralphs, Rodgers) - 4:19
"Feel Like Makin' Love" (Ralphs, Rodgers) - 4:56
"Movin' On" (Ralphs) - 3:21
"Simple Man" (Ralphs) - 4:56
"Rock Steady" (Rodgers) - 4:09
"Shooting Star" (Rodgers) - 5:47
"Can't Get Enough" (Ralphs) - 4:31
"Rock 'n' Roll Fantasy" (Rodgers) - 4:35
"Ready for Love" (Ralphs; Mott the Hoople cover) - 8:28
"Good Lovin' Gone Bad" (Ralphs) - 4:01

Between "Honey Child" and "Burnin' Sky", they do another song called "Sweet Lil' Sister"

Personnel
Paul Rodgers – lead vocals, piano, guitar
Mick Ralphs – lead guitar, piano
Howard Leese – guitar, background vocals
Lynn Sorensen - bass, background vocals
Simon Kirke – drums
Jim Rivers – producer

References

Bad Company albums
2010 live albums